Thomas Bridges may refer to:
 Thomas Bridges (dramatist and parodist) (c. 1710–c. 1775), English writer of parodies
 Thomas Bridges (botanist) (1807–1865), English botanist and traveling specimen collector
 Thomas Bridges (Anglican missionary) (1842–1898), Anglican missionary and linguist
 Thomas Bridges (Australian politician) (1853–1939), member of the Queensland Legislative Assembly
 Thomas Bridges, 2nd Baron Bridges (1927–2017), British diplomat
 Thomas Edward Bridges (1783–1843), Oxford college head
 Tom Bridges (1871–1939), British military officer and Governor of South Australia
 Tommy Bridges (1906–1968), American baseball player
Sir Thomas Pym Bridges, 7th Baronet (1805–1895), of the Bridges baronets

See also
 Bridges (disambiguation)